Commonwealth free trade is the process or proposal of removing barriers of trade between member states of the Commonwealth of Nations. The preferential trade regime within the British Empire continued in some form amongst Commonwealth nations under the Imperial Preference system, until that system was dismantled after World War II due to changes in geopolitics and the pattern of global trade, and the United Kingdom's entry into the European Economic Community. The idea of promoting renewed inter-Commonwealth trade emerged in the late 20th century as a response to the evolution of the global economy. At one extreme, proposals have been raised for the creation of a multilateral free trade area comprising all member states of the Commonwealth of Nations.

Today, most Commonwealth countries are pursuing regional integration projects, including the European Union (2 members), Caribbean Community (12 members), Southern African Customs Union (5 members), East African Community (4 members), and the South Asian Association for Regional Cooperation (4 members). However, at the 2005 Summit in Malta, the heads of government endorsed Commonwealth members pursuing free trade amongst one another in order to assist the development of poorest members by allowing them duty-free and quota-free access to the markets of developing and developed countries. The heads of government also endorsed looking into ways the organisation can strengthen dialogue, networking, and collaboration on trade and economic issues between Commonwealth members.

The concept of a multilateral Commonwealth free trade area has recently become popularised in Britain among Eurosceptics who campaigned for withdrawal from the EU prior to the UK's EU membership referendum, which resulted in the decision to leave.

History

High Imperialism 
Throughout the 17th, 18th and 19th centuries, Britain exercised an informal trade system with her colonies and self-governing dominions.

Last years of empire 

During the early 20th century, several political figures in Britain, led by Joseph Chamberlain, argued for a policy of Imperial Preference – both to promote unity within the British Empire, and to assure Britain's position as a world power. The policy was controversial as it pitted proponents of Imperial trade with those who sought a general policy of trade liberalisation with all nations.

The schism helped contribute to the defeat of Prime Minister Arthur Balfour and his Conservative-Unionist government in the 1906 general election, and had serious ramifications for Conservative prospects in the 1923 and 1929 general elections. One notable victory had been the establishment of the Empire Marketing Board in 1926, which encouraged Britons to 'Buy Empire'.

In 1930, Oswald Mosley and several junior ministers in the Labour government issued the Mosley Memorandum proposing a reform of the British Empire and its Dominions into an autarkic trading bloc, alongside extensive public works programs funded by high loans and better pensions to reverse interwar unemployment and poverty. The Memorandum was rejected by the Cabinet under Prime Minister Ramsay MacDonald and Chancellor of the Exchequer Philip Snowden on grounds of cost and deficit, and was also rejected by the Parliamentary Labour Party and the National Executive Committee. Mosley subsequently departed the Labour Party to form the New Party, and later became the founder of the British Union of Fascists.

Depression and Ottawa Conference 

In 1933, in the midst of the Great Depression, representatives of Britain, the Dominions, and the Colonies met in Ottawa, Canada, to hold the Commonwealth Conference on Economic Consultation and Co-operation. There had been an initial agreement on Imperial Preference, but a comprehensive agreement failed to materialise. Many of the Dominion leaders attributed this to the attitude of the British Dominions Secretary J. H. Thomas during the negotiations.

In 1935, the Canadian Prime Minister, R. B. Bennett, a Conservative who endorsed Imperial Preference, was replaced by a Liberal, William Lyon Mackenzie King. King responded to pressure from U.S. Secretary of State Cordell Hull and abandoned Imperial Preference.

In the case of the Commonwealth, the United States was hostile to it from its inception, notwithstanding the fact that in the cases of Canada, Australia, New Zealand and South Africa, there was an overwhelming preference for a trade system based on the United Kingdom rather than the U.S.

Post-war 

The conclusion of World War II drastically affected the prospects for an agreement Commonwealth trade. The United States emerged as the foremost political and economic power, and its policy was to promote generalised free trade, primarily through the General Agreement on Tariffs and Trade (GATT). The United Nations Monetary and Financial Conference, held in Bretton Woods, New Hampshire, in 1944, had also created a direct link between the value of gold and the United States dollar, thereby establishing it as the world's reserve fiat currency under the Bretton Woods system.

The war had also left Britain heavily indebted, economically weakened, and unable to absorb the flow of exports from Commonwealth jurisdictions. The Dominions, primarily Canada, directed their trade more heavily to the US market as a consequence.

The idea of enhanced trade between Canada and Britain was explored in the mid-1950s by the Conservative government of Prime Minister John G. Diefenbaker. The plan, in response to the Canadian government's concern with over-reliance on the United States, was to adopt policies that would see up to 15 percent of Canada's US exports diverted to the UK. Representatives for both Diefenbaker and British Prime Minister Harold Macmillan held exploratory talks, but no agreement was ever reached.

British entry into the EEC
Britain's entry into the European Economic Community (EEC) in 1973, and its evolution as a member state of the European Union (EU) had meant that for practical purposes, the United Kingdom could not independently enter into negotiations with Commonwealth states to establish a free trade agreement. In accordance the Articles of the European Union, the Union acted as representative of all its members, collectively.  However, subsequent to the 23 June 2016 referendum and the eventual departure of Britain from the EU, Britain has become responsible for all of its own negotiations on international trade.

The Commonwealth Effect
The 1997 Commonwealth Heads of Government Meeting (CHOGM) at Edinburgh was presented with research conducted by Drs. Sarianna Lundan and Geoffrey Jones, and commissioned by the Commonwealth Secretariat. The paper, entitled "The 'Commonwealth Effect' and the Process of Internationalisation", measured whether or not Commonwealth jurisdictions enjoyed a qualitative advantage in trade with one another as opposed to equivalent non-Commonwealth nations. Their research found that even in the absence of trade treaties, there was a clear cost advantage in trade between Commonwealth nations, and that the overhead costs of doing business were reduced by up to 15 percent in comparison to trade outside the Commonwealth.

Commonwealth Advantage
The Commonwealth Advantage program was a shared initiative between the Toronto Branch of the Royal Commonwealth Society, and the Canadian Advanced Technology Alliance (CATA) which ran from 2004 until 2008. Chaired by the Hon. Sinclair Stevens, a former Canadian International Trade Minister, the campaign was focused on developing strategic partnerships between Commonwealth-based companies.

CHOGM 2005 – Malta
In response to the lack of progress achieved in the Doha round of trade liberalisation negotiations in the World Trade Organization, Commonwealth Heads of Government, at their 2005 Summit in Malta, endorsed the idea of pursuing trade agreements among Commonwealth member states.

After Brexit

Since declaring its intention to withdraw from the European Union, the United Kingdom has begun to quickly negotiate successor agreements with dozens of countries and blocs, including many Commonwealth members. Completed agreements include those with CARIFORUM , Fiji and Papua New Guinea, (March 2019) Southern African Customs Union and Mozambique (October 2019), Kenya (November 2020) and Australia (December 2021).  Discussions with Canada were expected to conclude by late 2020.  Several other nations that do not have free trade with the EU are also in negotiations with the United Kingdom, including New Zealand. However, none of these negotiations have involved Commonwealth-wide or free trade or any other broader proposal.

Commonwealth free trade as policy
Because of their very different economic profiles, Commonwealth countries' interests are not always aligned. In principle, resource exporters such as Canada, Australia, and most of the Caribbean and African Commonwealth countries are complementary to resource importers such as the United Kingdom and India. However, the historical trade ties between them were based on terms that were dictated by the Colonial Office in Britain. Since the former dominions and colonies have achieved independence, they are free to refuse British initiatives and seek better deals elsewhere. Specifically, agricultural exporters in the Cairns Group (including members Australia, Canada, New Zealand, Pakistan, and South Africa) are at odds with the importing countries at the World Trade Organization. These countries pursue independent trade policies. Notably Australia (2005) and Canada (1988), and Singapore (2004) have free trade agreements with the United States, and New Zealand (2008) has one with China.  Meanwhile, New Zealand and Singapore are already members of the Trans-Pacific Strategic Economic Partnership, which Australia, Canada and Malaysia are attempting to join (along with major non-Commonwealth countries).  Furthermore, the proposed Comprehensive Economic Partnership for East Asia would include Malaysia, Singapore, Brunei, India, Australia, and New Zealand.

Canada 

Commonwealth trade, as such, has not been a notable policy position in Canada since the failed Diefenbaker proposal of the 1950s.  Instead, Canada has pursued deep economic integration with the United States on the one hand (including the Canada–United States Free Trade Agreement in 1988, the North American Free Trade Agreement in 1994, and the United States–Mexico–Canada Agreement in 2018), and a generalised diversification of trade on the other hand including the "third option" policy of the 1970 (a failed attempt to diversify Canada's trade via negotiations with Japan and the European Economic Community). This has been reinforced with a new wave of free trade agreements following NAFTA in 1994, including five Latin American countries, the European Free Trade Association and more recently the European Union, as well the failed Free Trade Area of the Americas in the early 2000s, and negotiations towards the Trans-Pacific Partnership since 2012.

In 2005, Canadian writer and political activist Brent H. Cameron wrote 'The Case for Commonwealth Free Trade', which argued the merits of establishing a trade and investment agreement that would initially combine the most developed member economies (Australia, Canada, New Zealand, Singapore) but could eventually include developing members such as India and South Africa. Cameron conceded that UK participation would be difficult with European Union (EU) membership, but suggested that it be included if Britain were to exit that agreement:

"It is proposed that a CFTA membership and expansion be conducted in four distinct phases: Phase 1 would see the creation of an initial grouping of four nations - Australia, Canada, New Zealand, and the United Kingdom. This grouping represents the most affluent and industrialized economies of the Commonwealth. Combined with stable political, judicial and social institutions, their ability to quickly integrate into a CFTA is vitally important if the organization is to have the ability to expand and succeed."

, 75% of Canadian trade takes place with countries which Canada has a free trade agreement, but this does not include any Commonwealth members.   Canada is currently in negotiations with the Caribbean Community (primarily Commonwealth countries), as well as India and Singapore.  Canada has signed free trade agreements with the European Union (Malta and Cyprus are Commonwealth members). This initially included the UK but following Brexit, a deal was signed directly between Canada and the UK.

New Zealand
Winston Peters, the leader of the New Zealand First political party, called in February 2016 for a Commonwealth Free Trade Area modelled on the Closer Economic Relations Trade Agreement between Australia and New Zealand. In his comments, he suggested the inclusion of the UK, Canada, Australia and New Zealand in this area, with the possibility of adding South Africa, India, or others, referring to the putative free trade area as a 'Closer Commonwealth Economic Relations' area, or CCER. CCER was included as New Zealand government policy in the Labour-NZ First coalition agreement.  New Zealand has been negotiating a free trade deal with the UK, following its withdrawal from the EU's Customs Union.

United Kingdom

Policy before Brexit 

The United Kingdom has been a member of the European Union and has therefore been unable to negotiate its own trade agreements for several decades.  However, after the United Kingdom formally leaves the European Union, it may again be able to negotiate its own trade deals.   While the UK has been in the EU it has actively pressured the EU to pursue trade agreements with other Commonwealth countries. In part, this has resulted in the EU initiating negotiations on free trade agreements with a number of Commonwealth countries. At present, Canada and India are both in the midst of negotiating free trade agreements with the European Union. Furthermore, a number of Commonwealth countries, including South Africa, Cameroon, Zambia, and the 12 commonwealth members of the Caribbean Community, already have free trade agreements with the EU. The EU, through the Lome and Cotonou Agreements, have extended some preferential trade access to developing Commonwealth countries.

However, the idea of establishing a free trade area within the Commonwealth has garnered interest in the UK amongst politicians and parties that advocated leaving the European Union who cite the development of a Commonwealth free trade policy as an important step in reshaping the UK's trade policy. The UK Independence Party has included a call for a Commonwealth Free Trade Agreement in its policy manifesto during the 2010 British general election. In addition, some members of the British Conservative Party, including MEP Daniel Hannan and MP Andrew Rosindell, have written extensively on the merits of expanding trade within the Commonwealth and the broader Anglosphere.

On October 8, 2012, Tim Hewish and James Styles released their paper "Common Trade, Common Wealth, Common Growth" at the UK Conservative Party Conference in Birmingham, England. The following day saw British Foreign Secretary William Hague comment upon how the Commonwealth, which had been 'neglected' by previous UK governments, presented "enormous opportunities" for the nation.

Supporters of Britain's membership of the European Union have criticised the proposal for a Commonwealth free trade area as unlikely in practice to come to fruition.

Policy since Brexit 

The policy since the end of Brexit has been to maintain the integrity of a free and independent state regaining its sovereignty, it has been upon not just commonwealth free trade but also that of CANZUK and a $20 trillion United States trade deal the UK now having clearly wider interests then that of the 26 EU member states, yet Norway, Switzerland, Russia, and Ukraine, not in the EU but as European nations are of interest for trade. 

The commonwealth however is still important to the UK nations rejoining like the Maldives with 53 members, with India in the commonwealth its the biggest democracy, its PPP is judged to surpass the US by 2050, so trade with the UK would be of significant interest to the UK as a matter of economic progress.

See also 
 CANZUK
 Commonwealth banknote-issuing institutions
 Commonwealth Freedom of Movement Organisation
 Imperial Federation
 Imperial Preference
 List of Commonwealth of Nations countries by GDP
 List of stock exchanges in the Commonwealth of Nations

References

External links 
 Commonwealth Secretariat
 UK Independence Party
 Canadian Advanced Technology Alliance (CATA)
 The Case for Commonwealth Free Trade
 Home-Commonwealth Trade

Anglosphere
Commonwealth of Nations
Proposed free trade agreements